The 2009 TUMS Fast Relief 500 was the 32nd race of the 2009 NASCAR Sprint Cup season at the beginning of the second half of the 2009 Chase for the Sprint Cup. The 500-lap,  event, the only race on the Chase that is held on a short track, was held on October 25, 2009 at Martinsville Speedway in Martinsville, Virginia. Denny Hamlin won while points leader Jimmie Johnson finished second.

This was the last career start for NASCAR veteran Sterling Marlin, who retired shortly thereafter, and the first race in over three years for 1990 Daytona 500 winner Derrike Cope.

References

TUMS Fast Relief 500
TUMS Fast Relief 500
NASCAR races at Martinsville Speedway
October 2009 sports events in the United States